Saxa may refer to:
Saxa (food product), a brand of salt and pepper
Saxa (musician) (1930–2017), saxophonist